Podolobium aciculiferum, commonly known as needle shaggy-pea, is a flowering plant in the family Fabaceae and endemic to eastern Australia. It has stiff, pointed leaves and yellow pea-like flowers with red markings.

Description

Taxonomy and naming
Podolobium aciculiferum was first formally described in 1859 by  Ferdinand von Mueller and the description was published in  Fragmenta Phytographiae Australiae. The specific epithet (aciculiferum) means "needle-pointed".

Distribution and habitat
Needle shaggy-pea grows in wet locations in sclerophyll forests and rainforest margins, usually in stony situations on escarpments and the coast north of Nerrigundah.

References

Fabales of Australia
Flora of New South Wales
Flora of Queensland
aciculiferum
Plants described in 1855
Taxa named by Ferdinand von Mueller